Carex  divisa  is a species of sedge known by the common names divided sedge and separated sedge. It is native to Europe, Asia, and North Africa, and considered naturalized in Australia, New Zealand, and scattered locations in North America.

References

divisa
Flora of Europe
Flora of Asia
Flora of North Africa
Plants described in 1762